Semien Shewa Zone may refer to:

Semien Shewa Zone (Amhara), Amhara Region, Ethiopia